"White Lines (Don't Don't Do It)" is a song by American hip hop recording artist Melle Mel, released as a 12" in 1983 on Sugar Hill Records. The song, which warns against the dangers of cocaine, addiction, and drug smuggling, is one of Mel's signature tracks. The bassline is taken from a performance of the Sugar Hill house band (featuring bassist Doug Wimbish) covering "Cavern", a single by New York City band Liquid Liquid.

Overview
When originally released on Sugar Hill Records, the record was credited to Grandmaster & Melle Mel (some international issues carried the credit Grandmaster Flash & Melle Mel). By this time, Grandmaster Flash had already stopped touring with Mel and was suing Sugar Hill Records for back royalties. The animosity between the two artists continued well into the future.

"White Lines" peaked at No. 47 on the Billboard Hot Black Singles chart in 1983. The song fared better in the United Kingdom, reaching number 7 on the UK Singles Chart in July 1984, spending 17 consecutive weeks in the top 40. It was the 13th best-selling single of 1984 in the UK, selling more than several number one hits that year.

The song was co-written by Melle Mel and Sylvia Robinson. Originally, it was intended to be an ironic celebration of a cocaine-fueled party lifestyle, but it was abridged with the "don't do it" message as a concession to commercial considerations.

The lines "A businessman is caught with 24 kilos / He's out on bail and out of jail and that's the way it goes" refers to car manufacturer John DeLorean, who in 1982 became entrapped in a scheme to save his company from bankruptcy using drug money. Some of the lyrics in "White Lines" ("something like a phenomenon") echoed lyrics from the song "Cavern" by Liquid Liquid ("slip in and out of phenomenon"), in addition to the note-by-note appropriation of the bass line from "Cavern" with a rapping track overlaid. Sugar Hill did not get proper clearance to use "Cavern," resulting in years of lawsuits, ultimately in Liquid Liquid's favor. As a result of the $600,000 judgment against Sugar Hill, the label declared bankruptcy to circumvent paying the judgment.

An unofficial music video was directed by Spike Lee, then a New York University film student, and starred actor Laurence Fishburne.

Charts

Weekly charts

Year-end charts

Duran Duran version

A 1995 cover version of "White Lines" featuring performances from Grandmaster Flash and Melle Mel was released as the second single from English new wave band Duran Duran's eighth studio album, Thank You (1995). The single reached No. 17 on the UK Singles Chart, No. 5 on the US Dance Club Songs chart, No. 20 in Australia and No. 31 in New Zealand. The band continues to perform the song as a regular part of their live set.

This single had more promo releases than most bands have releases, and across this myriad of 12" and CD singles the band released more than 20 distinct remixes and edits of "White Lines", many of which were crafted by DJ Junior Vasquez. Apart from the singles and the Thank You album, the song also appeared as a B-side on the first single from the album, "Perfect Day".

A black and white music video was shot in January 1995 by Nick Egan, featuring Duran Duran, Melle Mel, and the Furious Five performing the song accompanied by breakdancers and people in skeleton masks.

On July 8, 2009, The Late Late Show with Craig Ferguson did a lip sync version of the Duran Duran cover featuring puppets on backing vocals.

Critical reception
Steve Baltin from Cash Box wrote, "England’s favorite former pretty boys have taken to the streets for the first single from their long-in-the-works album of covers entitled Thank You. To lend validity to the song the group, now a quartet, enlisted Grandmaster Flash and the Furious Five as well as Melle Mel to lend background vocals. While the combination may sound frightening, the song has already picked up major adds at Modern Rock, and following the success of their last album, should also get Top 40 airplay." Dave Sholin from the Gavin Report felt that "at first this Grandmaster Flash classic and Duran Duran seem like an unlikely pairing, but it won't after you hear the finished work. This first release from an album of covers [...] is an exceptional effort."

Charts

References

External links
Group's Official Website
The Kidd Creole's Official Website

1983 songs
1983 singles
1995 singles
American hip hop songs
Capitol Records singles
EMI Records singles
Music videos directed by Spike Lee
Songs involved in plagiarism controversies
Songs about cocaine
Songs about crime
Songs written by Sylvia Robinson
Songs written by Melle Mel
Sugar Hill Records (Hip-Hop label) singles